Duncan Graham (October 5, 1845 – February 7, 1934) was a Canadian politician and farmer.

He was born in the  township of Mara, Ontario County, Canada West, the grandson of early settlers from Scotland. A farmer, Graham was involved in local politics serving as a councillor and then deputy reeve and reeve of Mara Township. In 1896 he was Warden of Ontario County.

Graham first ran a seat in the House of Commons of Canada in the 1896 federal election as a candidate for the Patrons of Industry, a left-wing farmers' party, in the riding of Ontario North. He was defeated by a single vote by Conservative John Alexander McGillivray but the election was overturned and Graham won the February 4, 1897 by-election held in the riding and sat in parliament as an Independent Liberal. He was defeated in the 1900 federal election.

Duncan Graham died in 1934. He was buried with his parents.

Electoral history

References

External links 
 

1845 births
Independent MPs in the Canadian House of Commons
Members of the House of Commons of Canada from Ontario
1934 deaths
People from Brock, Ontario